The 2009 Guangzhou International Women's Open (also known as the TOE Life Ceramics Guangzhou International Women's Open for sponsorship reasons) was a women's tennis tournament on outdoor hard courts. It was the 6th edition of the Guangzhou International Women's Open, and was part of the WTA International tournaments of the 2009 WTA Tour. It was held in Guangzhou, People's Republic of China, from September 14 through September 20, 2009.

Champions

Singles 

 Shahar Pe'er defeated  Alberta Brianti 6–3, 6–4
 It was Pe'er first title in over 3 years, and her 4th title overall.
 It was Brianti's first final appearance at the WTA Tour.

Doubles 

 Olga Govortsova /  Tatiana Poutchek defeated  Kimiko Date-Krumm /  Sun Tiantian 3–6, 6–2, [10–8]

Entrants

Seeds 

 1 Seeds are based on the rankings of August 31, 2009
 Jie Zheng was forced to withdraw due to a left wrist injury, so Maria Elena Camerin became the no. 9 seed.

Other entrants 
The following players received wildcards into the singles main draw
  Lu Jingjing
  Yan Zi
  Han Xinyun

The following players received entry from the qualifying draw:
  Chen Yanchong
  Zhang Ling
  Chang Kai-Chen
  Tatiana Poutchek

The following players received lucky loser spot in the Main Draw:
  Abigail Spears

References

External links 
 

Guangzhou International Women's Open
2009
Guangzhou International Women's Open